Alex Gil may refer to:

 Alex Gil (scholar) (born 1973), scholar of digital humanities and Caribbean studies
 Alex Gil (architect) (born 1977), New York-based architect